Thomas Stanislaus McAllister (1878 – 29 April 1950)  was an Irish nationalist politician.

McAllister worked as a solicitor and became active in the United Irish League.  At the 1925 Northern Ireland general election, he was elected for the Nationalist Party in Antrim.  He took his seat almost immediately, alongside Joe Devlin, and the rest of the party gradually followed suit.  He stood down at the 1929 general election, shortly after his election to the Senate of Northern Ireland.  He became the party leader in the Senate and served until his death in 1950. He served as Deputy Speaker of the Senate 1930–32 and 1942–44.

McAllister was a native of Ballymena. He was noted as a huntsman, racing cyclist and also played football for Bohemians football club.

References

1878 births
1950 deaths
Members of the House of Commons of Northern Ireland 1925–1929
Members of the Senate of Northern Ireland 1929–1933
Members of the Senate of Northern Ireland 1933–1937
Members of the Senate of Northern Ireland 1937–1941
Members of the Senate of Northern Ireland 1941–1945
Members of the Senate of Northern Ireland 1945–1949
Members of the Senate of Northern Ireland 1949–1953
Nationalist Party (Ireland) members of the House of Commons of Northern Ireland
Nationalist Party (Ireland) members of the Senate of Northern Ireland
Solicitors from Northern Ireland
Members of the House of Commons of Northern Ireland for County Antrim constituencies